Jicalapa is a municipality in the La Libertad department of El Salvador.

External links
 Jicalapa

Municipalities of the La Libertad Department (El Salvador)